Station Master is a 1966 Indian Malayalam film,  directed and produced by P. A. Thomas. The film stars Prem Nazir, Sathyan, Adoor Bhasi and Hari in the lead roles. The film had musical score by B. A. Chidambaranath and M. A. Majeed.

Cast
Prem Nazir
Sathyan
Adoor Bhasi
Hari
T. R. Omana
K. P. Ummer
Kaduvakulam Antony
Kamaladevi
Prathapan
Ushakumari

Soundtrack
The music was composed by B. A. Chidambaranath and M. A. Majeed, with lyrics written by P. Bhaskaran.

References

External links
 

1966 films
1960s Malayalam-language films